Kodak is a maker of photo and printing products.

Kodak may also refer to:

Places
Kodak, Kentucky, an unincorporated community
Kodak, Tennessee, an unincorporated community
Kodak Fortress, a historic fort in Ukraine

Structures
Kodak Fortress, a fort built in 1635 over the Dnieper River near modern-day Dnipro, Ukraine
Kodak Tower, a skyscraper in Rochester, New York
Dolby Theatre or Kodak Theatre, a theater in Los Angeles, California
Eastman Business Park or Kodak Park, a manufacturing and industrial complex

Other uses
kodak (book), a 1972 poetry collection by Patti Smith
The Kodaks, an American doo-wop group on Lost Nite Records

People with the given name
Kodak Black, hip hop recording artist born and raised in Pompano Beach, Florida

See also
Kodak Park Railroad
Kodaku people, an indigenous people living in India, in hills and forest of Chhotanagpur
Kodiak (disambiguation)